Jacob's Dream is an American power metal band originally based in Columbus, Ohio. The band formed in the mid-1990s under the name of Iron Angel. Their first three full-length releases were released on the Metal Blade Records label.

Biography
The band features guitarists John Berry and Jon Noble, bassist James Evans, drummer Gary Holtzman, and frontman Kevin Wright. The group's first major release was in 2000 with their self-titled album Jacobs Dream, which was released on Metal Blade Records. The band's original vocalist David Taylor left after the second album Theater of War due to family commitments. Taylor was replaced by ex-BioGenesis vocalist Chaz Bond, who first appeared on the 2005 album Drama of the Ages. In 2008 the band released the album Dominion Of Darkness, and the album Beneath the Shadows in 2009. In late 2013, Chaz bond left the band to concentrate on BioGenesis and was replaced by Kevin Wright. In July 2016 David Taylor returned to the band but unfortunately other commitments led to his departure in September 2018. Kevin Wright has returned to the band and is the current vocalist.

Band members
Current
Kevin Wright - vocals
David Taylor - vocals
Jon Noble - guitar
James Evans - bass guitar
Gary Holtzman - drums

Former members
John Berry - Guitar, Synth, vocals
Chaz Bond - Vocals
Rick May - Drums
Derek Eddleblute - Guitar
Billy Queen - Drums
David Taylor - Vocals
Steve Vaughan - Drums
Patrik DePappe - Guitar / Bass
Paul Whitt - Guitar
Andy Frasure - Guitar
Ben Lamb - Bass
Mike Armstrong - Drums

Discography
Jacobs Dream Demo (indie 1997)
Jacobs Dream (Metal Blade 2000)
Theater of War (Metal Blade 2001)
Drama of the Ages (Metal Blade 2005)
Dominion of Darkness (Indie 2008)
Beneath the Shadows (2009)
Sea of Destiny (2017)

References

External links
Official website
Facebook

Heavy metal musical groups from Ohio
Metal Blade Records artists
American power metal musical groups
American progressive metal musical groups
Musical groups established in 1997